Franz Sznayde (1790 Poland - 1850) was a Polish senior military officer.

Sznayde participated in the November Uprising in 1830 and 1831 by the Poles against the Russian Empire.  In 1849, he became a general in the Baden-Palatinate insurgent army.

Sznayde died in 1850.

Sources
 Sznajde Franciszek
 gen. bryg. Franciszek Sznajde (1790—1850)

1790 births
1850 deaths
Polish military personnel
Burials at Montmartre Cemetery